The second season of Srugim, is an Israeli television drama which originally aired on Yes TV between 10 January 2010 and 9 May 2010. It was directed by Laizy Shapiro, who co-created it with Hava Divon.

Cast

Main
Ohad Knoller as Dr. Nethaniel "Nati" Brenner
Amos Tamam as Amir Yechezkel
Ya'el Sharoni as Yifat
Tali Sharon as Hodaya Baruchin
Sharon Fauster as Reut Rosen
Uri Lachmi as Roi Brenner

Recurring
Michael Warshaviak as Gershon Brenner
Gal Pertziger as Asaf
Alena Yiv as Clumsy waitress

Plot
Season 2 began approximately six months after the conclusion of season 1. Amir and Yifat get married and now must cope with the new hardships, including fertility problems and the need to observe ritual purity. Amir returns to his roots and begins praying in a Tunisian synagogue with an old man named Shmuel. He is frowned upon by his Ashkenazi environment. Nati's mother dies and his brother Roi moves in with him. Reut returns from India after six months, after missing Amir and Yifat's wedding, as well as her sister Elisheva's wedding, who is now pregnant. Reut begins to date Roi, only to have Roi later reveal that he is a homosexual, to Nati's surprise. Reut refuses to give up on them and continues to date him, however Roi eventually ends things. Nati falls in love with Dafna, a divorced mother who works in his hospital as a medical clown, though he leaves her after realizing he cannot cope with raising her son. Hodaya, trying to lead a secular lifestyle, works in a pub and meets Assaf, another formerly religious man, with whom she loses her virginity. She breaks with him after discovering that he began practicing again.

Episodes

Production
The second season was shot in the summer of 2009.

Ratings
The second season was broadcast on Yes Stars between 10 January and 9 May 2010. During its airing, it was the most viewed show on Yes' website for February and May, and the second most viewed for March and April. The first episode was the site's most popular upload for 2010 in general. Channel 10 purchased this season and aired it from 16 October 2010 to 29 January 2011. It performed poorly, and had an average rating of merely 4.44%.

Awards
In the 2010 Israeli Academy of Film and Television ceremony, held on 13 July, the show had the largest number of nominations for any candidate, with a total of seven: Best Drama, Best Script, Best Director and two double nominations for the Best Actor – to Knoller and Amos Tamam – and Best Actress, again to Sharoni and Sharon. It lost all except one, receiving only the Award for the Best Script.

Source:

Controversy
Bus stop posters for the second season of Srugim became the focus of a controversy when it was discovered that the pages of Jewish text used as a background for the poster's images included the Biblical word referred to as the "ineffable name of God," the description used for the Tetragrammaton (four Hebrew letters commonly transliterated into English as YHVH or YHWH).

Complaints from the ultra-orthodox community led to an agreement not only to have the posters taken down, but also that—given the presence of God's name—they would be buried in a genizah [a burial site for sacred texts], not merely discarded.

References

2010 Israeli television seasons